Encinitas (Spanish for "Small Oaks") is a beach city in the North County area of San Diego County, California. As of the 2010 census, the city had a population of 59,518, up from 58,014 at the 2000 census.

History 
The first people to settle in Encinitas were the Kumeyaay. Gaspar de Portolá, governor of Baja California, visited the area in 1769 during the Portolá expedition and met residents from the nearby Kumeyaay village of Jeyal or Heyal, near the San Elijo Lagoon. Portolá named the valley Los Encinos for the oak forest along El Camino Real, where there was also a village that was likely known as Hakutl in New Encinitas.

After Mexican Independence, land was granted to Andrés Ybarra in 1842 to build Rancho Las Encinitas in what is now Olivenhain and New Encinitas, from which Encinitas got its namesake. Encinitas is a Spanish name meaning "little oaks".

The town of Old Encinitas formed in 1881 by Jabez Pitcher.

The city was incorporated by 69.3% of the voters in 1986 from the communities of historic Encinitas, New Encinitas (Village Park, etc.), Leucadia, Cardiff-by-the-Sea, and Olivenhain. The communities retain their identities and distinctive flavors.

Geography 

Encinitas lies on rugged coastal terrace. The city is bisected by a low-lying coastal ridge that separates New and Old Encinitas. In the north of the city, the coast rises in elevation and the land is raised up in the form of many coastal bluffs. These cliffs are subject to collapsing on the narrow beach. The city is bounded by Batiquitos Lagoon to the north and San Elijo Lagoon to the south.

Communities 
Encinitas can be divided into five areas:
Old Encinitas: a small beachside area featuring a mix of businesses and housing styles. Sitting along Coast Highway 101 (Historic US 101), the Encinitas welcome arch, the famous surf break Swamis, and the early 20th century La Paloma Theater are located here. Old Encinitas is divided from New Encinitas by a low coastal ridge.
New Encinitas: a newer region which features a golf course, many shopping centers, and is composed of larger tract homes.
Olivenhain: a semi-rural region in eastern Encinitas, composed of mostly single family homes, an active 4-H Club, and several private equestrian facilities. Olivenhain connects to Rancho Santa Fe via Encinitas Boulevard.
Leucadia: a coastal community of the city. Leucadia features tree-lined streets and boulevards. The community features art galleries, unusual stores, and restaurants, along with single family homes. This also contains beaches such as Beacons and Grandview.
Cardiff-by-the-Sea: Encinitas' southernmost oceanfront community, which features streets named after British cities and classical composers, the Lux Art Institute, and the San Elijo Campus of Mira Costa College.

Climate
Encinitas has a very mild, Mediterranean climate. Temperatures below  and above  are rare. The wet season lasts during the winter and spring, when temperatures are usually cool. Average daytime temperatures hit 65 °F in winter and spring, when rain and marine layer (fog) are common (May Gray/June Gloom). Nighttime lows range from 45 to 55 °F. The dry season lasts from summer through fall, with average daytime temperatures ranging from 75 to 85 °F, and nighttime lows being from the upper 50s–60s°F. Ocean water temperatures average 60 °F in winter, 64 °F in spring, 70 °F in summer, and 66 °F in fall. In winter, strong Pacific storms can bring heavy rain. During the winter of 2015–2016, the area saw rounds of severe thunderstorms.

Demographics

2010
At the 2010 census Encinitas had a population of 59,518. The racial makeup of Encinitas was 51,067 (85.8%) White, 361 (0.6%) African American, 301 (0.5%) Native American, 2,323 (3.9%) Asian, 91 (0.2%) Pacific Islander, 3,339 (5.6%) from other races, and 2,036 (3.4%) from two or more races. Hispanic or Latino of any race were 8,138 persons (13.7%).

The census reported that 58,990 people (99.1% of the population) lived in households, 123 (0.2%) lived in non-institutionalized group quarters, and 405 (0.7%) were institutionalized.

There were 24,082 households, 6,997 (29.1%) had children under the age of 18 living in them, 12,113 (50.3%) were opposite-sex married couples living together, 1,950 (8.1%) had a female householder with no husband present, 981 (4.1%) had a male householder with no wife present. There were 1,359 (5.6%) unmarried opposite-sex partnerships, and 169 (0.7%) same-sex married couples or partnerships. 6,303 households (26.2%) were one person and 2,118 (8.8%) had someone living alone who was 65 or older. The average household size was 2.45. There were 15,044 families (62.5% of households); the average family size was 2.98.

The age distribution was 12,285 people (20.6%) under the age of 18, 3,767 people (6.3%) aged 18 to 24, 16,584 people (27.9%) aged 25 to 44, 19,239 people (32.3%) aged 45 to 64, and 7,643 people (12.8%) who were 65 or older. The median age was 41.5 years. For every 100 females, there were 97.9 males.  For every 100 females age 18 and over, there were 95.3 males. Females comprise the majority of Encinitas' population at 50.5% as of April 2010.

There were 25,740 housing units at an average density of 1,287.7 per square mile, of the occupied units 15,187 (63.1%) were owner-occupied and 8,895 (36.9%) were rented. The homeowner vacancy rate was 1.0%; the rental vacancy rate was 5.3%. 39,101 people (65.7% of the population) lived in owner-occupied housing units and 19,889 people (33.4%) lived in rental housing units.

2000
As of the census of 2000, there were 58,014 people in 22,830 households, including 14,291 families, in the city. The population density was 3,035.6 inhabitants per square mile (1,172.1/km). The racial makeup of the city was 86.60% White, 0.59% Black or African American, 0.46% Native American, 3.10% Asian, 0.12% Pacific Islander, 6.28% from other races, and 2.85% from two or more races. 14.80% of the population were Hispanic or Latino of any race.

Of the 22,830 households 31.0% had children under the age of 18 living with them, 50.1% were married couples living together, 8.8% had a female householder with no husband present, and 37.4% were non-families. 25.7% of households were one person and 6.9% were one person aged 65 or older. The average household size was 2.52 and the average family size was 3.06.

The age distribution was 23.1% under the age of 18, 7.2% from 18 to 24, 33.4% from 25 to 44, 25.9% from 45 to 64, and 10.4% 65 or older. The median age was 38 years. For every 100 females, there were 99.2 males. For every 100 females age 18 and over, there were 96.3 males.

The median household income was $63,954 and the median family income was $78,104. Males had a median income of $51,132 versus $38,606 for females. The per capita income for the city was $34,336. About 3.8% of families and 7.3% of the population were below the poverty line, including 6.9% of those under age 18 and 5.7% of those age 65 or over.

Arts and culture

Encinitas Ballet. Encinitas Ballet is a classical ballet studio in Encinitas. It was established in 2008 by Sayat Asatryan, former principal dancer of the Kremlin Ballet Theatre, and Olga Tchekachova, former soloist of the Mariinsky Ballet II.

Regular events
 April Street Fair: annual two-day street fair, held every April in downtown Encinitas
Encinitas Bazaar Marketplace: a colorful, outdoor shopping experience
Deep Pit BBQ: held the end of May at the San Dieguito Heritage Museum
 Encinitas Environment Day: held on the 2nd Sunday of June- environmentally-themed games and entertainment for families.
 Lima Bean Faire and Battle of the Beans Cook-off: held each September at the San Dieguito Heritage Museum, 450 Quail Gardens Drive
 Fall Festival: annual one-day street fair, held each November in downtown Encinitas
 OktoberFest: held on the last Sunday in September to coincide with the Oktoberfest celebrations in Germany.
 Classic Car Cruise Nights: classic cars line Coast Highway 101 in downtown Encinitas on the 3rd Thursday of each month, May–September
 The Wavecrest Woodie Meet: takes place once a year on the third Saturday of September at Moonlight State Beach. It is the largest rally of wooden-bodied vehicles in the world and it is free to the public and to participants.
 Wellness Week: annual week-long program of events and special offers designed to help people learn about and experience ways to improve their well-being
 Salute to Education: Encinitas Chamber of Commerce Salute to Education event that is held each year in June honoring local teachers and students for their outstanding efforts during the current school year. This event is hosted each year by Rancho Santa Fe Security Systems.
 Switchfoot Bro-Am: annual free surf competition and outdoor music festival usually held in early July at Moonlight State Beach, home of the world's only Surf Jousting competition, along with several other competitive surfing events.  All proceeds from the event go to local charities.

Surfing Madonna

In 2011 Mark Patterson and Robert Nichols illegally installed a  mosaic of a surfing Virgin de Guadalupe on the north concrete support wall of the train bridge on Encinitas Boulevard, leading to a battle over whether it should be removed or preserved. It was named "the Surfing Madonna" by the media and public.

Museums and other points of interest

The Lux Art Institute, San Dieguito Heritage Museum, and Encinitas Historical Society are located in Encinitas. Other points of interest include the San Diego Botanic Garden, Self-Realization Fellowship temple and Hermitage, as well as the gardens which are routinely open to the public, the historic La Paloma Theater, Moonlight Beach, and one of California's classic downtown areas along historic Coast Highway 101. Surfing is a popular activity in Encinitas, particularly at Swami's, which is rated in the top 5 surf locations in the world, and is mentioned in a verse of The Beach Boys' song "Surfin' U.S.A." A bronze statue "Humanity" was installed at J Street Overview in 2018. Sculptress is Maidy Morhous. Donors are Sue & Jay Vicory. Manchester Reserve is great for nature walk and light hiking.

Cardiff Kook - Magic Carpet Ride 

The Magic Carpet Ride, or more affectionately known by Encinitas locals as the Cardiff Kook, is a 16 ft bronze statue located in Cardiff-by-the-Sea, in the city of Encinitas. The San Diego Architectural Foundation, in its annual "Orchids & Onions" awards for the best and worst architecture of the year, awarded the Kook an Onion in 2007. The nickname comes from a derogatory surfer slang term for a "wannabe" surfer, as surfers in the area realized that the statue's form whilst "surfing" was far from correct. However, the Kook has become a local favorite in the city and has many wonderful traditions associated with it. At various times during the year, the Kook is "vandalized" and dressed up (wearing a lucha libre mask, being eaten by a paper-mache shark, wearing a full Uncle Sam costume for Independence Day, used by local high school students to ask each other to school dances) bringing local flair and tourists constantly to the statue.

Economy
Since 1982, the Encinitas 101 Main Street Association has helped keep downtown Encinitas economically viable yet historic and beachy. Downtown Encinitas is vibrant and full of thriving local salons, restaurants, shops, bars, and art galleries.

Transportation
Coaster trains stop at Encinitas station multiple times a day, 7 days a week with service from Oceanside to San Diego. Between 2013 and 2017, Amtrak's Pacific Surfliner also stopped here, but discontinued this stop due to low ridership.

Government

Local government 

The city is currently governed by a five-member city council, with a mayor and four council members.  The mayor is elected citywide and the council members are elected by district to staggered four-year terms at two-year intervals.  The deputy mayor is chosen by the city council members from among themselves.

In elections held in November 2012, Encinitas voted yes on ballot measures to allow them to directly elect its mayor, with term lengths of two years, rather than the mayor being chosen by members of the city council, for one year terms. The first such direct election for mayor took place in 2014.

The city has been repeatedly sued over policies which are allegedly aimed at undermining state affordable housing laws.

State and federal representation

Education

School districts
 Cardiff School District
 Encinitas Union School District
 San Dieguito Union High School District

Visual Art schools
 Watts Atelier of the Arts

Colleges
 California Institute for Human Science
 Mira Costa College District
 Mira Costa College, San Elijo Campus
 St. Katherine College

High schools
 Grauer School (Private, college preparatory)
 San Dieguito Academy
 Pacific Academy
 Sunset Continuation High School

Middle schools
Diegueño Middle School
Encinitas Country Day School (private Middle School)
Grauer School (private)
Oak Crest Middle School
The Rhoades School (private)

Elementary schools
Ada Harris Elementary School
Cardiff Elementary School
Capri Elementary School
Encinitas Country Day School (private)
Flora Vista Elementary School
Ocean Knoll Elementary School
Olivenhain Pioneer Elementary School
Park Dale Lane Elementary School
Paul Ecke Central Elementary School
Rancho Encinitas Academy (private)
The Rhoades School (private)
Saint John The Evangelist School (private)
Sanderling Waldorf School (private)

Notable people
 Guy Beahm, video game streamer and Internet personality known as "Dr DisRespect"
Cindy Lee Berryhill, American singer-songwriter and wife of the late Paul Williams
 Jerry Buss, owner of the Los Angeles Lakers
Diana Serra Cary, Child Star Known as Baby Peggy
 Michael Chang, professional tennis player
 Claire Chase, classical flautist
Harold Cohen, Pioneer of Computer-Generated Art
Tom Dempsey, Record-Setting NFL Kicker
 Richard Dreyfuss, American actor
Robert Ellsworth, Lawmaker, Nixon Aide, Obama supporter
 John Fairchild, professional basketball player
 Manny Farber, film critic
 Mary Fleener, underground comics artist
 Tim Foreman, bassist for Switchfoot
 Lukas Gage, actor
 Rune Glifberg, Danish professional skateboarder
 Tony Hawk,  professional skateboarder
Kit Horn, pioneer surfer
Mel Hutchins, B.Y.U. All-American and N.B.A. All-Star
 Bobbi Jordan, actress
Allan Kaprow, American painter, assemblagist and a pioneer in establishing the concepts of performance art
Cloris Leachman American actress and comedienne
 Andy McMillin, Baja 1000 winner and off-road racing driver
 Hugh Martin, Broadway and film composer, Meet Me in St. Louis
Jerry Mathers, American actor
Jack McDowell, baseball player and musician
 Mike McGill, professional skateboarder. inventor of the McTwist
 Jeremy McGrath, Supercross racer
 Mark McMorris, professional Canadian snowboarder (two-time Olympic Bronze Medalist)
 Mickey Moniak (born 1998), baseball player
Patti Page, American pop singer and occasional actress
 Emily Ratajkowski, model and actress
 Ravi Shankar, acclaimed sitarist 
 Staciana Stitts, 2000 Olympic gold medalist 
Jack Tempchin American musician and singer-songwriter
Patricia Canning Todd, tennis champion, refused to play on side court
 Eddie Vedder, lead singer of Pearl Jam
Joe Walsh, American rock guitarist, singer, and songwriter
 Irene Ware, actress - (last place of residence)
 Ryn Weaver, singer and songwriter 
 Paul Williams, journalist, author, creator/publisher of first US magazine of rock

Sister cities
Amakusa City, Japan

References

External links

 

 
Cities in San Diego County, California
North County (San Diego County)
Populated coastal places in California
San Diego metropolitan area
Incorporated cities and towns in California
Populated places established in 1986
1986 establishments in California